Miguel Alemán González (1884 – March 20, 1929) was a Mexican general who served in the Mexican Revolution.

Early life
Miguel Alemán González was born in 1884.

Military career
Alemán González was a pioneer of the Mexican Revolution in the state of Veracruz.

Alemán González took up arms again in 1927. He spearheaded a movement of armed resistance against presidents Álvaro Obregón and Plutarco Elías Calles.

Death and legacy
Alemán González died on March 20, 1929 in San Juan Evangelista. He either committed suicide, or he was burned alive as General Miguel Acosta set fire to the forest where he was hiding during a battle. He was buried in Sayula de Alemán on March 25, 1937.

His son, Miguel Alemán Valdés, served as the 46th President of Mexico from 1946 to 1952.

References

1884 births
1929 deaths
People from Veracruz
People of the Mexican Revolution
Mexican generals